Rudolf II, Margrave of Baden-Baden (died 14 February 1295) was the second son of Margrave Rudolf I and his wife Kunigunde of Eberstein.  Until his father's death, he was known as Rudolf the Younger; after his father's death, he was known as Rudolf the Elder, to distinguish him from his youngest brother.

Rudolf II married Adelaide of Ochsenstein, who was the widow of a Count of Strassberg.  She had a son and two daughters from her first marriage.  Her daughter Gerrtud married Rudolf's youngest brother Rudolph III.

See also 
 List of rulers of Baden

References 
 

Margraves of Baden
13th-century births
1295 deaths
13th-century German nobility